Herman Jay "Hank" Cohen (born February 10, 1932) is an American diplomat who served as United States Assistant Secretary of State for African Affairs from 1989 to 1993.

Career
Herman Jay Cohen, born in New York City on February 10, 1932, received a BA in political science from the City College of New York in 1953. He then joined the United States Army, serving until 1955. He received an MA in international relations from American University in 1962. He served in the Foreign Service as a consular officer, attaché, and political counselor until his appointment to the post of United States Ambassador to Gambia and Senegal in 1977, serving until 1980. He later served as Principal Deputy Assistant Secretary of State for Intelligence and Research from 1980-1984, a Special Assistant to the President and Senior Director for Africa on the U.S. National Security Council from 1987-1989, and U.S. Assistant Secretary of State for African Affairs from 1989-1993.

After leaving government, Cohen served as a senior advisor to the Global Coalition for Africa before becoming a professorial lecturer at Johns Hopkins School of Advanced International Studies for twelve years. Currently he is president and CEO of Cohen and Woods International. He also serves on the Board of Directors of Hyperdynamics Oil and Gas and as a consultant for ContourGlobal.

Bibliography

See also
Operation Solomon
Angolan Civil War

References

External links
Hank Cohen's Africa Blog

1932 births
Living people
Assistant Secretaries of State for African Affairs
United States Career Ambassadors
Ambassadors of the United States to the Gambia
Ambassadors of the United States to Senegal
Paul H. Nitze School of Advanced International Studies alumni
City College of New York alumni
American University School of International Service alumni
American chief executives
United States Foreign Service personnel
20th-century American diplomats